Halog may refer to:

Halog (city), the capital of the former Princely State of Dhami in India
a tradename for Halcinonide
Two islands in the Quiniluban Group in Palawan Province, Philippines

See also
 Halogen (disambiguation)